Locksbottom is a suburb of south-east London within the London Borough of Bromley, Greater London. Prior to 1965 it was within the historic county of Kent. It is located south of Bromley Common, west of Crofton, north-west of Farnborough, and east of Keston.

History
The area is named after the Lock family, who owned land here in the 1700s. A workhouse was built here in March 1845, though by the 1920s it had been converted into an infirmary known as Farnborough Hospital. The interwar years saw suburban development and the area merged into Orpington in the east. In 2003 the hospital was redeveloped and renamed Princess Royal University Hospital and is now one of the major hospitals in this part of London.

Amenities
Locksbottom is centred on a parade of shops on the western end of Crofton Road, running from the junction with Farnborough Common to Tugmutton Common. To the west lies Keston Park and to the north Farnborough Park, both of which are exclusive gated communities. A large supermarket backs onto the Princess Royal Hospital. There are also three pubs in the area - the Black Horse, the British Queen, and Ye Olde Whyte Lion. The church is St. Michael's and all Angel's Roman Catholic Church, and was built between 1961 and 1964 by Henry Bingham Towner of loadbearing brickwork, laid in English bond, around a steel frame.

Transport

Rail
The nearest National Rail station to Locksbottom is Orpington station, located 1.8 miles away.

Buses
Locksbottom is served by London Buses routes 61, 261, 336, 353, 358, R2, R3 & R4. These connect it with areas including Biggin Hill, Beckenham, Bromley, Catford, Chislehurst, Crystal Palace, Grove Park, Hayes, Lewisham, Orpington & Penge.

Gallery

In Film
The former 'Fantail Restaurant', with views over and into the village, showing the land where now Saint Michael's Church stands, heavily planted with trees, with unidentified spots along the A21 nearby, may be seen in the now re-released on DVD film, Calling All Cars (1954 film).

References

Areas of London
Districts of the London Borough of Bromley